Alexander Ranacher (born 20 November 1998) is an Austrian professional footballer who plays as a midfielder for Tirol.

Career
Ranacher is a youth product of the youth academy of Matrei and Wolfsberger AC. He was promoted to their reserves in 2015, and their senior side in 2016. On 7 July 2018, he transferred to Austria Lustenau on a 2-year contract. On 21 January 2020, he extended his contract for another year until 2021. On 14 July 2021, he transferred to Tirol.

References

External links
 
 OEFB Profile

1998 births
Living people
People from Lienz
Austrian footballers
Wolfsberger AC players
SC Austria Lustenau players
WSG Tirol players
Austrian Football Bundesliga players
2. Liga (Austria) players
Austrian Regionalliga players
Association football midfielders